The 2008 Bosaso bombings occurred on February 5, 2008. Explosives, timed to go off together in north-eastern Somalia city of Bosaso, killed at least 20 people and wounded over 100.

References

Somalia War (2006–2009)
Al-Shabaab (militant group) attacks
Mass murder in 2008
Terrorist incidents in Somalia in 2008
February 2008 events in Africa
February 2008 crimes